Tano may refer to

Places
Ghana/Ivory Coast
 Tano North District and
 Tano South District in Ghana, which make up
 Tano North (Ghana parliament constituency) and
 Tano South (Ghana parliament constituency)
 Tano River or Tanoé River in Ghana and Ivory Coast
Italy
 Tano, Italy, a place in Campania
Japan
 Tano, Ehime, a former village in Ehime Prefecture, Japan
 Tano, Kōchi, a town in Japan
 Tano District, Gunma in Japan
 Tano Station (disambiguation), either one of the train stations named thus, in Kōchi or in Miyazaki prefecture of Japan
 Tano, Miyazaki, a former Japanese town, now part of the city of Miyazaki

Other
 Tano (name)
Tano Kami, Japanese spirit observing the harvest of rice plants
 Ahsoka Tano, a Force-wielder in the Star Wars universe
 An alternate name for the Arizona Tewa, a Pueblo group from Arizona
 Bofoakwa Tano, a football team from Sunyani, Ghana
 Tano languages, a group of Kwa languages spoken in the Tano River region
 Tano Cariddi, Remo Girone's character in the Italian TV drama La piovra
 Tano-Sitha, a binary star system in the Nightfall universe
 Tano, a Korean Rhapsody, written by Djong Victorin Yu
 Tano, a former Norwegian publishing company
 A colloquial name for Italians in Argentina
Tano, the Akan God of war and strife

See also
 Tanno